The 2014 Ankara Cup is a professional tennis tournament played on indoor hard courts. It is the fourth edition of the tournament which is part of the 2014 ITF Women's Circuit, offering a total of $50,000 in prize money. It takes place in Ankara, Turkey, on 15–21 December 2014.

Singles entrants

Seeds 

 1 Rankings as of 8 December 2014

Other entrants 
The following players received wildcards into the singles main draw:
  Başak Eraydın
  İrem Kaftan
  İnci Öğüt
  İpek Soylu

The following players received entry from the qualifying draw:
  Jana Fett
  Elizaveta Ianchuk
  Valentyna Ivakhnenko
  Anna Shkudun

The following player received entry by a protected ranking:
  Akgul Amanmuradova

Champions

Singles 

  Aleksandra Krunić def.  Akgul Amanmuradova, 3–6, 6–2, 7–6(8–6)

Doubles 

  Ekaterine Gorgodze /  Nastja Kolar def.  Oleksandra Korashvili /  Elitsa Kostova, 6–4, 7–6(7–5)

External links 
 2014 Ankara Cup at ITFtennis.com
 Official website 

2014 ITF Women's Circuit
2014 in Turkish tennis
Ankara Cup
December 2014 sports events in Turkey